Hats Off is an album by jazz trumpeter Chet Baker and the Mariachi Brass recorded in 1966 and released on the World Pacific label.

Reception

Allmusic rated the album with 3 stars.

Track listing
 "Happiness Is" (Paul Evans, Paul Parnes) - 1:57   
 "Sure Gonna Miss Her" (Bobby Russell) - 2:29   
 "Bang Bang (My Baby Shot Me Down)" (Sonny Bono) - 2:40   
 "The Phoenix Love Theme (Senza Fine)" (Gino Paoli, Norman Newell) - 2:43   
 "These Boots Are Made for Walkin'" (Lee Hazlewood) - 2:54   
 "On the Street Where You Live" (Alan Jay Lerner, Frederick Loewe) - 2:04   
 "Armen's Theme" (Ross Bagdasarian, Sr.) - 2:32   
 "Spanish Harlem" (Jerry Leiber, Phil Spector) - 2:23   
 "Chiquita Banana" (Garth Montgomery, Len MacKenzie, William Wirges) - 1:55   
 "When the Day Is All Done (Foy O)" (A. Tracy, P. Tracy, W. Holt) - 2:15   
 "You Baby" (P. F. Sloan, Steve Barri) - 2:38   
 "It's Too Late" (Bobby Goldsboro) - 2:38

Personnel
Chet Baker - flugelhorn
Tony Terran - trumpet
The Mariachi Brass
Jack Nitzsche (tracks 5, 9 & 11), George Tipton (tracks 1–4, 6–8, 10 & 12) - arranger, conductor

References 

1966 albums
Chet Baker albums
Pacific Jazz Records albums
Albums arranged by Jack Nitzsche
Albums arranged by George Tipton